The Selma Plantation is a Southern plantation with a historic cottage located in Natchez, Mississippi, USA.

History
The house was built circa 1811 by Gerard Chittocque Brandon. His son, Gerard Brandon, served as the Governor of Mississippi from 1825 to 1826, and again from 1826 to 1832. The property remained in the Brandon family until 1875.

Architectural significance
The cottage was designed in the Federal architectural style. It has been listed on the National Register of Historic Places since June 15, 1989.

The home is also a Mississippi Landmark property.

References

Plantation houses in Mississippi
Houses in Natchez, Mississippi
Federal architecture in Mississippi
Antebellum architecture
Houses on the National Register of Historic Places in Mississippi
National Register of Historic Places in Natchez, Mississippi